The World Journalism Preparatory School (WJPS) (25Q285) is a public high school in Flushing, New York, United States. The school is part the Adrien Block Campus, and shares space with IS 25 Adrien Block School (25Q025) and P233 (a school for disabled children).

History and origin 
Dr. Janine Werner became principal in 2017.

The high school opened in 2005 and later opened a middle school in the same building.

Extra-curricular activities and after-school clubs

Sports teams 
All of WJPS sports teams are via Public Schools Athletic League. However all students sports teams are from Francis Lewis High School.

After-school program 
WJPS offers a free after-school program through the Greater Ridgewood Youth Council (GRYC). It is funded by the Schools Out New York City (SONYC) after-school framework for middle schools from NYC Department of Youth & Community Development.) It started in the 2014–2015 school year. This free high quality after-school program at IS25Q and World Journalism Preparatory School is only for grades 6-8 (students in World Journalism Preparatory School in grades 9-10 can join as youth employment). Students are given free snacks and homework help. They are then given activities aligned to the Common Core. Activities include Art/Drama Club, STEM Club, Chess Club, Guitar/Music Club, Builder's Club, Team Sports Club, Video Game Club, and Fitness Club. The program runs Monday through Friday, from 2:30 to 5:30pm.

References 



Public high schools in Queens, New York
Flushing, Queens